The Jolt is the sole album by Scottish mod revival band The Jolt, released in July 1978 by Polydor Records.

Release 
The first single released by the band was the double-A-sided "You're Cold!" / "All I Can Do". However, "You're Cold!" wasn't included on the original release of the album. "All I Can Do" was included on the album and was released as a single in Germany, with "You're Cold!" as the B-side. The next two singles, a cover of the Small Faces "Whatcha Gonna Do About It" and "I Can't Wait" also flopped.

The album was reissued on CD in 2002 by Captain Mod, a sub-imprint of Captain Oi! Records, and includes the B-sides from The Jolt's singles as well as the four tracks from the EP Maybe Tomorrow.

Reception 
Reviewing the album for Record Mirror, Bev Briggs wrote "Three things to get your name in lights – expertise, exploitation or experimentation. The three 'E's to success. Surely The Jolt could have managed one of them. The finesse isn't there – but we accept their apologies because they're a relatively new band. The exploitation, the gimmick also notable by its absence (Thank God!), so you gamble your last greenback on experiment. Sorry, The Jolt don't. Their mistake. A new band can afford to gamble. Can afford to release 10 riotously different tracks on their debut LP. Should risk the tentative walks on the wild Side. The Jolt stagnate in the safety zone, so young and yet so careful."

Reviewing retrospectively for AllMusic, Dave Thompson described The Jolt as "one of the few bands who not only straddled the divide between classic punk and that more specialist sound, they were also the only ones who could give label- (and genre-) mates a run for their money." But that "by the time of their self-titled debut album, however, the Jolt were already consigned to dwell in the Jam's lengthening shadow, a fate that the band themselves seemed to encourage. The best tracks on the album were those that could have sprung from Weller's pen -- and that is precisely where they did get "See Saw," the finest song among the eight bonus tracks appended to the Captain Oi! reissue. The B-side to Jolt's final single, "Maybe Tonight," the song was written for the band by the Jam man himself. But there is so much more to Jolt than an adrenalin rush of Jam-isms. Noisy, exuberant, eminently danceable and absolutely exhilarating, Jolt is the sound of mod at its most potently creative, a record that could have been made in 1965, but was certainly remixed in 1978, to take into account all that had happened since then. Even more importantly, the passing years have chipped none of that original excitement away, and Jolt remains just that...a welcome, thrilling jolt."

Track listing 

2002 CD bonus tracks:

Personnel 
The Jolt

 Robbie Collins – guitar, vocals, harmonica
 Jim Doak – bass guitar, vocals
 Iain Shedden – drums

Technical

 Hugh Jones – recording engineer
 Vic Coppersmith-Heaven – remix engineer
 David Garland, Nick Cook – assistant engineers
 Tim Turan – mastering
 Jo Mirowski – art direction and design
 Peter McGregor – equipment technician
 John Shaw – photography
 Recorded at IBC Studios, remixed at Morgan Studios and mastered at Strawberry Mastering

References 

Polydor Records albums
1978 debut albums
albums recorded at IBC Studios